Chryseobacterium polytrichastri  is a Gram-negative, rod-shaped and non-spore-forming bacteria from the genus of Chryseobacterium which has been isolated from the moss Polytrichastrum formosum from the Gawalong glacier from Tibet in China.

References

Further reading

External links
Type strain of Chryseobacterium polytrichastri at BacDive -  the Bacterial Diversity Metadatabase

polytrichastri
Bacteria described in 2015